Inman may refer to:

Places
Inman, Georgia
Inman, Illinois
Inman, Kansas
Inman, Nebraska
Inman, New Brunswick
Inman, South Carolina
Inman, Tennessee
Inman, Virginia
Inman Square, Cambridge, Massachusetts
Inman Township (disambiguation)

Other uses
Inman (surname)
Inman Line, British shipping company 
Inman News
Inman Middle School, Virginia-Highland neighborhood of Atlanta, Georgia
, a British frigate in commission in the Royal Navy from 1944 to 1945